Television broadcasting in Greece began in 1966. Nevertheless, the first TV series was aired in 1970 and was the series To Spiti me ton Foinika, aired by YENED. The next series was O Kyrios Synigoros in the same year. The first years of television there were only public channels. The first channels were the channel EIR and the TED, the channel of armed forces. Few years later TED renamed to YENED and EIR became EIRT. The public channels renamed again after the coming of PASOK in the power and they became ERT1 and ERT2. Famous series of the period of public television are O Agnostos Polemos, I Geitonia Mas, Louna Park, Christ Recrucified, Methoriakos Stathmos, oi Pantheoi. In 1989, Greek television entered in a new period, the period of private television. The first private TV channels started to broadcast in 1989. The period 1995–2009 is the best period of the Greek television and frequently characterized as the golden age of the Greek TV.

Public television era (1970–1989)

1970–1979

1980–1989

Private television era (1989–present)

1989–1994

1995–1999

2000–2004

2005–2009

2010–2019

2020-

References

Television in Greece

Greece
Series